Emanuele Geria (born 29 July 1995) is an Italian footballer who plays as a goalkeeper.

Career

Slavia Sofia 
On 4 September 2017, after a spending a trials, Geria joined the Bulgarian First League club Slavia Sofia. On 19 March 2018, after an injury of the first choice goalkeeper Georgi Petkov 30 minutes before the match against Pirin Blagoevgrad, Geria made his debut for the team.

Reggina
On 21 October 2019 he returned to the club he was raised in, Serie C side Reggina, signing a contract until 30 June 2020.

Career statistics

Club

References

External links

Living people
Sportspeople from Reggio Calabria
1995 births
Italian footballers
Association football goalkeepers
Trapani Calcio players
PFC Slavia Sofia players
Reggina 1914 players
First Professional Football League (Bulgaria) players
Footballers from Calabria
Italian expatriate footballers
Italian expatriate sportspeople in Bulgaria
Expatriate footballers in Bulgaria